Serbian Railways (/Železnice Srbije, abbr. ŽS or ЖС) is a Serbian engineering and technical consulting company based in Belgrade, Serbia.

In 2015, the Government of Serbia established three new companies which took over Serbian Railways' former jurisdictions: Srbija Voz (passenger transport), Srbija Kargo (cargo transport) and Serbian Railways Infrastructure (infrastructure management).

Since then, Serbian Railways continued with modified business activity: engineering and technical consulting, consulting activities in the field of information technology and other information technology services, buying and selling real estate, rental and management activities, accounting, bookkeeping and auditing activities, tax advisory services, technical testing and analysis, rental and leasing of other machinery, equipment of non-material goods, activities of the museums, galleries and collections.

Serbia is a member of the International Union of Railways (UIC). The UIC Country Code for Serbia is 72.

History

Early history
The history of rail transport in Serbia began in the mid-19th century when most of the territory was still held by the Austro-Hungarian and Ottoman Empires. The first rail line on the present-day territory of Serbia was inaugurated on 20 August 1854, between Lisava-Oravica-Bazijaš and the train operated on horse-drawn traffic which was replaced in 1856 by steam locomotives. Part of the line is located in Serbia, passing through Bela Crkva while the rest is in Romania.  All subsequently built lines were laid towards Budapest as the territory was still part of the Austro-Hungarian Empire back then.  On the territory which was under the Ottomans, the line Skopje-Kosovska Mitrovica was inaugurated in 1874.  However, the major expansion began after the Berlin Congress and the independence of the, theretofore vassal to the Ottomans, Principality of Serbia during the second half of the 19th century.

Serbian Railways as a company is traced back to 1881 when Prince Milan I declared formation of the Serbian National Railways. The first train departed from Belgrade to Niš on 23 August 1884, which is considered by Serbian Railways as the official year when the company was created.

This was not the first operational railway on the territory of then-Kingdom of Serbia, though, as the one in opened in 1882, a primarily industrial, though occasionally used for passenger transport, 12 km long 600 mm wide gauge track from Majdanpek copper processing plant to Velike Livade (a former village taken over by the plant) and constructed by the Serbian Copper & Iron Co. (official name in English, most stockholders were British) had its first run on the track in June 1882.

Another one in Eastern Serbia followed suit in 1888, the 82 km long dual purpose (industrial and passenger transport) 760 mm gauge track from Vrška Čuka mine to the port of Radujevac on the Danube, built by the Societé Anonyme "L'Industrielle Serbe" registered at Brussels in Belgian, French, (Austro-)Hungarian, and Serbian ownership (in order of the percentage of stock owned).

From the 1920s until the 1990s, it operated under the name Yugoslav Railways, responsible for railways in the Socialist Federal Republic of Yugoslavia. The first electrified line was opened between Belgrade and Šid in 1970. The line connecting Serbia with south Adriatic (Belgrade-Bar) was opened in 1976.

1990–2015
 
During the 1990s, following the dissolution of the Socialist Federal Republic of Yugoslavia, railways in Serbia suffered the lack of maintenance of infrastructure and the level of traffic, especially cargo, decreased dramatically. As of 2000, Serbian Railways had a total of 32,832 employees. The negative trend continued into the 2000s.  Better days for railways started in the early 2010s when program of modernization, both of infrastructure and rolling stock, have begun.

In 2013, Serbian Railways signed a contract with RZD International, worth $840 million, aimed at modernization of aging infrastructure by focusing on improving key sections of main railway lines. The section between Ruma and Golubinci on Belgrade-Šid line was reconstructed in 2014 and additional five sections on Belgrade-Niš-Preševo line (Sopot-Kosmajski Kovačevac, Mala Krsna-Velika Plana, Vinarce-Đorđevo, Vranjska Banja-Ristovac, and Bujanovac-Bukarevac) were modernized and revitalized in 2015 and 2016, while the section between Belgrade and Pančevo on Belgrade-Vršac line saw doubling tracks along with the reconstruction.

2015–present
 
In March 2015, the Government of Serbia announced its plan to establish three additional new railway companies, splitting the Serbian Railways in separate businesses. Those companies are: Srbija Voz operating passenger transport, Srbija Kargo operating cargo transport and Serbian Railways Infrastructure operating as infrastructure management company.

Those three companies, fully separated and independent from the Serbian Railways were founded on 10 August 2015, in the process of reconstruction and better optimization of business. In the process, around 6,000 employees left the company with severance payments, witch amounts to 39 million euros, by the end of 2017, thus cutting total number of employees from 17,635 in 2016 to around 11,500 in 2018, in all four rail related companies combined. From 2018 to 2020, in the third wave of dismissals, another 1,500 employees are planned to leave the company, cutting the total number of employees to around 10,000 by 2020. That would be 7,635 less employees (43.29%) than in 2016, and 22,800 less (69.51%) than in 2000.

Current modernization projects

 
In February 2019, Srbija Voz temporarily suspended transportation on Belgrade–Novi Sad railway, one of the country’s most frequent passenger routes, in February 2022, due to the railway line’s reconstruction. This line in now completely reconstructed and modernized and the Fast trains - named "SOKO" are going up to 200 km/h, connecting two biggest cities in 36 minutes. The route is 75 km long and its reconstruction is currently extended from Novi Sad to Subotica, (border with Hungary) for the speed of 200 km/h as part of the modernization of the Belgrade-Budapest railway line.

The reconstruction and modernization of the railway lines is also planned between Belgrade and Niš for a speed of 200 km/h, Niš and Preševo for the speed of 160 km/h(border with North Macedonia) and Niš and Dimitrovgrad for the speed of 120 km/h(border with Bulgaria).

In 2017, as part of the contract with RZD, reconstruction began on the Belgrade-Novi Sad-Subotica line, on the section between Stara Pazova and Novi Sad, Belgrade-Bar line, on the section between Resnik on the outskirts of Belgrade, and Valjevo.

New investments in rolling stock took place in the following years. Around 60 new passenger trains (39 diesel multiple units RA2 from the Russian company Metrovagonmash and 21 electric multiple units FLIRT3 from Swiss company Stadler) were ordered and are currently in service. Because of this, passenger numbers dramatically raise on the lines operated by the new trains.

Passenger transport

Srbija Voz inherited the passenger transport from the Serbian Railways following the establishment. Since 2015, it offers many train services across the country and in the region which include international routes to neighbouring countries and domestic routes (fast, regional and local lines).

It is possible to buy passengers tickets online throughout Srbija Voz website: https://webapi1.srbvoz.rs/ekarta/app/#!/home. The company also offer the mobile application for Android (https://play.google.com/store/apps/details?id=com.srbijavoz.app) and IOS (https://apps.apple.com/rs/app/srbija-voz/id1600735042) operating systems.

The Serbian railway system consists of 3,739 km of rails of which 295 km is double track (7.9% of the network). Some 1,279 km of track (33.6% of the network) is electrified. Serbia has rail links with all of adjacent countries, except Albania.

Domestic railway network

Railroads are categorized as "main lines", "regional lines", "local lines" or "manipulative lines". Following is the table of main lines in Serbia:

International railway network

Srbija Voz operates EuroCity trains on following routes:

Train Avala connects Belgrade to Vienna 
Train Beograd connects Belgrade  to Budapest 
Train Balkan connects Belgrade  to Sofia 
Train Hellas connects Belgrade  to Thessaloniki 

Srbija Voz other international rail routes are:

Train Tara connects Belgrade  to Bar

Rolling stock

 Electric locomotives
 ŽS 441 with total of: 44 units (29 in service)
 ŽS 444 with total of: 30 units (23 in service)
 ŽS 461 with total of: 51 units (35 in service)
 ŽS 193 with total of: 16 units (16 in service)
 Diesel locomotives
 ŽS 621 with total of: 17 units (N/A in service)
 ŽS 622 with total of: 4 units in total (4 in service) 
 ŽS 641 with total of: 37 units (11 in service)
 ŽS 644 with total of: 6 units (2 in service)
 ŽS 661 with total of: 42 units (23 in service)
 ŽS 664 with total of: 6 units on lease from Slovenian Railways)
 ŽS 666 with total of: 4 units (2 in service)
 Electric trainsets
 ŽS 412 with total of: 20 units (14 in service)
 ŽS 413 with total of: 21 units (21 in service)
 ŽS 410 with total of: 3 units (3 in service)
 Diesel trainsets
 ŽS 711 with total of: 39 units (39 in service)
 Passenger carriages
 Passenger cars - "open" or "compartment" with total of: 364 units
 Sleeping cars   with total of: 52 units
 Couchette cars with total of: 63 units
 Dining cars.      with total of: 15 units

See also
Transport in Serbia
Srbija Voz
Srbija Kargo
Serbian Railways Infrastructure

References

External links

 
 Clip about the Belgrade railway hub and Beovoz commuter network
 Clip about the new central railway station
 Serbian Rail Map (passenger lines)

 
1881 establishments in Serbia
Companies based in Belgrade
Construction and civil engineering companies of Serbia
Engineering companies of Serbia
Government-owned companies of Serbia
Rail transport in Serbia
Railway companies established in 1881
Serbian brands